Petko Ganev (born 17 September 1996) is a Bulgarian professional footballer who currently plays as a defender for Bulgarian First League club Botev Vratsa.

References

External links
 

1996 births
Living people
Bulgarian footballers
First Professional Football League (Bulgaria) players
Second Professional Football League (Bulgaria) players
FC Vereya players
FC Sozopol players
PFC Litex Lovech players
FC Botev Vratsa players
FC Arda Kardzhali players
Association football defenders
People from Dimitrovgrad, Bulgaria
Sportspeople from Haskovo Province